Mathilde Norholt (born 1983) is a Danish actress. She is mainly known for her role in the DR television series Lykke and for musicals and theatre.

Early life and education
Mathilde Norholt was born in the Frederiksberg district of Copenhagen to the actress Kirsten Norholt and the actor Flemming Sørensen Norholt. She has no formal education as an actress but has studied multimedia design.

Career
Mathilde Norholt has had roles in Danish television series and short films from an early age but experienced a breakthrough with her role in the DR television series Lykke in 2011. She has also appeared in major theatre and musical performances. In addition to Danish, her first language, she is fluent in English.

Personal life
Norholt lives with her life partner Kristian Errebo Krantz in Copenhagen. They have a daughter, born in June 2017.

Filmography

Films
 Snøvsen Ta'r Springet (The Snooks in the Limelight) (1994) – Pernille Blomme
 Offscreen (2006) – Mathilde
 Hvid nat (White Night) (2007) – Saras veninde
 Sorte Kugler (What Goes Around) (2009) – Nadja
 Chloe Likes Olivia (short film; first English-speaking role) (2011) - Olivia
 Noget i luften (Something in the Air) (2011) - Sofie
 4Reality (2013) - Maria

Television series
2900 Happiness  (2008–09)
Kristian (TV series) (2009–11)
Lykke (TV series) (2011–12)
Vild med dans (2013)
Black Lake (2016)

References

1983 births
Danish actresses
Danish child actresses
Living people